Grayden is an unincorporated community in Fayette County, West Virginia, United States. It was also known as Free Union.

The community was named for the local Graydon family.

References 

Unincorporated communities in West Virginia
Unincorporated communities in Fayette County, West Virginia